"Fe Fi (The Old Man Died)", or simply "Fe Fi", is a country song by the Swedish band Rednex. It has been released in November 2006 through Pyjama Records as the second single of their independently released third studio album The Cotton Eye Joe Show.

Background
After a slump in their commercial appeal, Rednex made a minor comeback with their 2006 single "Mama, Take Me Home". Their comeback continued when this single in November 2006, after having performed it at the Nickelodeon Kids' Choice Awards.

Commercial performance
"Fe Fi (The Old Man Died)" was surprisingly successful, reaching #4 in the Swedish Single Chart respectively.

Track listing
 "Fe Fi (The Old Man Died)" - 3:15
 "Fe Fi (The Old Man Died)" (Instrumental) - 3:16

Charts

Weekly charts

Year-end charts

References

2006 singles
2006 songs
Rednex songs